Atlantic City Express  may refer to:

Atlantic City Express (Amtrak), a former Amtrak service
ACES (train), also known as the Atlantic City Express Service, was a rail service operated by New Jersey Transit.